Hwasin – Controller of the Heart was a South Korean talk show which aired from February 19 to October 1, 2013 on Tuesday nights at 11:20 pm KST on SBS. It was hosted by comedian Shin Dong-yup, actress Kim Hee-sun, and singer Yoon Jong-shin. Hwasin has several meanings, including God of Tuesday (화요일의 신; 火神) and God of Talk (화술의 신; 話神), as well as Shin Dong-yup and Yoon Jong-shin's Shin (신), and Goddess (여신) Kim Hee-sun. The program was referred to as the second season of Strong Heart, but with a different format focused on exploring lifestyle differences between generations through surveys to viewers. On May 1, 2013, it was announced that comedian Kim Gu-ra would join the program as new host, marking his return to SBS since his sudden departure from television in April 2012. The programs format was also be changed, abandoning the viewer surveys and focusing on people instead. The first episode to air with Kim Gu-ra and a new format aired May 14, 2013. On May 9, 2013, it was announced that Yoon Jong-shin will be leaving the show due to schedule and health issues. He was replaced by actor Bong Tae-gyu, who was a guest on the May 14th episode, and officially as new host airing May 21, 2013. After a seven-month run, Hwasin was officially cancelled due to low ratings on September 24, 2013, and was replaced by reality program Beating Heart.

Format

Episode 1–11 
Every week, thousands of viewers respond to surveys asking about different lifestyle issues. The different topics are reenacted through sketches with the hosts and guests. The guests must guess the #1 answers of different generations of viewers (10s to 50s) or of men and women in later episodes. Incorrect answers will be punished with a blast of air. The format is similar to past popular SBS talk shows, Ya Sim Man Man and Shin Dong-yup & Kim Won-hee's Hey Hey Hey, combining a ranking talk show with comedy sketches.

Episode 12–26, 28–29 
The format changes to a talk show focusing on people and life. New corners were created to emphasize life of people. A Line of Strength (한 줄의 힘) is a corner where guests bring a line (a meaningful saying or phrase) to explore ways of overcoming difficulties and hardships in life. Beginning with episode 13, Heard It As A Rumor (풍문으로 들었소) became the second new corner which focuses on rumors of the guests.

Episode 27, 30–31 
A special live episode titled, The Hwashin Live (a parody of The Terror Live), aired with an experimental format featuring an all live broadcast with no editing. As the first live talk show to ever air on South Korean television, the format brought four guests each with a question they would like to ask the general public and discuss in studio. Viewers could vote through SMS voting during the show, and the result would be shown on air. With no delay or editing, there is no margin for error as everything happening in studio would be broadcast live, bringing a thrill to the live format.

For episode 30, the show officially switched to an all live format titled, Live Hwasin – Hot Potato. The format is similar to the experimental episode featuring questions asked to the general public and SMS voting. Questions are known as "Hot Potatoes", which are recent hot topics in society and are discussed by the hosts and guests in an effort to identify with viewers. The second part of the live program, Star Potato, is the same as the previous live format where the guests ask the viewers a question. For episode 31, the show was simply titled, Live Hwasin, and followed a similar format to episode 27.

Hosts 
Shin Dong-yup (February 19, 2013 – October 1, 2013)
Kim Hee-sun (February 19, 2013 – October 1, 2013)
Yoon Jong-shin (February 19 – May 14, 2013)
Kim Gu-ra (May 14, 2013 – October 1, 2013)
Bong Tae-gyu (May 21, 2013 – October 1, 2013)

List of episodes

Ratings 
In the ratings below, the highest rating for the show will in be red, and the lowest rating for the show will be in blue.

References

External links 
  Hwasin - Controller of the Heart Official Homepage on SBS The Soty

Seoul Broadcasting System original programming
South Korean television talk shows
2013 South Korean television series debuts
2013 South Korean television series endings
Korean-language television shows